Tomasz K. Bartkiewcz (September 4, 1865 – March 25, 1931) was a Polish composer and organist, co-founder of the Singer Circles Union (Związek Kół Śpiewackich).

References
Witold Jakóbczyk, Przetrwać na Wartą 1815-1914, Dzieje narodu i państwa polskiego, vol. III-55, Krajowa Agencja Wydawnicza, Warszawa 1989

1865 births
1931 deaths
Polish composers
People from the Province of Posen